Cooper's Old Time Pit Bar-B-Que is a barbecue restaurant chain based in Llano, Texas.  Cooper's is best known for its two-inch-thick pork chop known as the "Big Chop", and for being President George W. Bush's favorite barbecue restaurant.

History
Cooper's Old Time Pit Bar-B-Que is one of several restaurants created by the Cooper family since the 1950s.  George T. Cooper opened "Cooper's Pit Bar-B-Q" in Mason, Texas in 1953. George's son, Tommy Cooper, opened his own barbecue restaurant in Llano in 1962, naming his "Cooper's Old Time Pit Bar-B-Que".  Tommy Cooper's restaurant went on to become the most famous of the various Cooper family restaurants.  Tommy Cooper died in 1979; his restaurant was operated for a few years by Texas barbecue chef Kenneth Laird, and then the Llano restaurant was acquired by current owner Terry Wootan in 1992. In 2005, Tommy's son, Barry, returned to the business & together with Wootan, expanded Cooper's business to open five more locations to date. Today, Cooper's Old Time Pit Bar-B-Que operates in six cities across the state of Texas. (Llano, New Braunfels, Fort Worth, Austin, College Station & Katy) 

Cooper's serves brisket, ribs, sausage, chicken and cabrito, but is most well known for its two-inch-thick pork chop, sold as "the Big Chop". The restaurant smokes its meats in large rectangular pits, using fast-burning mesquite wood to provide a more subtle smoky flavor than slow-smoked barbecue. Cooper's barbecue sauce, served on the side, is a pit-smoked concoction that includes ketchup, vinegar, black pepper, Louisiana hot sauce, lard and brisket drippings.

Locations
In 2008, Cooper's opened a second location in New Braunfels, Texas. In 2010, Cooper's opened its third location, a 26,000-square-foot venue in the Fort Worth Stockyards next to country nightclub Billy Bob's Texas. Cooper's fourth location, in downtown Austin, Texas, opened in January 2016. Cooper's fifth location opened in College Station, Texas, in October 2019 & the sixth location open in Katy, Texas, in November, 2019.

Features and awards

Cooper's has received positive reviews in The New York Times and The Washington Post.  In the early 2000s,  President George W. Bush declared it his favorite barbecue restaurant, an honorific that continues to be used in coverage of the restaurant.

In 2011, Cooper's was one of five restaurants representing Central Texas in Patricia Schultz's 1,000 Places to See in the USA and Canada Before You Die. In 2015, The Daily Meal ranked Cooper's #10 on its list of best barbecue ribs in the United States. In 2016, food critic and Legends of Texas Barbecue Cookbook author Robb Walsh named Cooper's #8 on his list of 10 favorite Texas barbecue spots. In 2017, USA Today declared Cooper's the winner of its Readers Choice award in the category "Best BBQ Brisket Sandwich in Texas".

See also
 List of barbecue restaurants

Notes

References

Restaurants in Texas
Barbecue restaurants in the United States
Restaurants established in 1964
1964 establishments in Texas
Tourist attractions in Llano County, Texas
Barbecue restaurants in Texas